This is a list of rivers and streams in Hawaii (U.S. state).

Modern maps show some 360 streams in the Hawaiian Islands. However, because of the small size of the islands in comparison with continental areas, there are very few navigable rivers anywhere in the islands.

The following list is sorted by name. Click on the double triangles at the top of the "Island" column to sort the table by island.

See also

List of rivers in the United States

References

External links
National Park Service Nationwide Rivers Inventory: Rivers and Trails of Hawaii (list of free-flowing river segments in the state that are believed to possess one or more "outstandingly remarkable" natural or cultural values)

Hawaiian rivers
 
Rivers